Pankajavalli is an Indian actress in Malayalam movies. She was known for her supporting roles during the late 1960s and 1970s in Malayalam. She made her debut in Jeevitha Nouka in 1951. She has acted in more than 50 movies. Her grand daughter Kaveri is also an actress in Tamil and Malayalam movies.

Personal life
Pankajavalli hails from Chengannur, Alappuzha. She is married to comedy actor and Mridangam player Nanukuttan and they have 3 children.

Filmography

 Ethirppukal (1984)
 Onappudava (1978)
 Vezhambal (1977)
 Amba Ambika Ambaalika (1976)
Thumbolarcha (1974) as Thumbolarcha's mother
 Boban and Molly (1971)
 Kochaniyathi (1971) as Bhavani
 Madhuvidhu (1970) as Kalyaniyamma
 Othenente Makan (1970) as Unnichara
 Thaara (1970)
 Dathuputhran (1970) as Rahel
 Nurse (1969)
 Jwala (1969) as Meenakshi
Urangatha Sundary (1969) as Ammayi
 Kumara Sambhavam (1969) as Veerani
 Anchusundarikal (1968)
 Punnapra Vayalar (1968) as Prabhakaran's mother
 Thirichadi (1968)
 Lady Doctor (1967) as Eliyamma
 Sahadharmini (1967)
 Mainatharuvi Kolakkes (1967)
 Kavalam Chundan (1967)
 Kasavuthattam (1967) as Musaliar's Mother
 Kudumbam (1967)
 Rowdy (1966)
 Priyathama (1966)
 Kanakachilanka (1966)
 Sthanarthi Saramma (1966) as Mariyamma
 Puthri (1966) as Deenamma
 Kusrithikkuttan (1966)
 Kaliyodam (1965)
 Pattuthoovala (1965) as Annakutti
 Ayisha (1964)
 Omanakuttan (1964)
 School Master (1964) as Bhavaniyamma
 Oraal Koodi Kallanaayi (1964) as Karthi
 Snapaka Yohannan (1963) as Herodias
 Bhaagyajaathakam (1962)
 Snehadeepam (1962) as Devakiyamma
 Kandam Becha Kottu (1961) as Khadeeja
 Jnaanasundari (1961) as Jnanasundari's stepmother
 Christmas Rathri (1961) as Thresiamma
 Poothali (1960)
 Nairu Pidicha Pulivalu (1958) as Kalyani
 Mariakkutty (1958) as Annamma
 Padatha Painkili (1957) as Kocheli
 Kaalam Maarunnu (1955)
 Avakasi (1954) as Madhavi
 Aashadeepam (1953)
 Lokaneethi (1953)
 Velakkaaran (1953)
 Vishappinte Vili (1952)
 Aathmasakhi (1952)
 Achan (1952)
 Jeevitha Nouka (1951)

References

External links

 Pankajavalli at MSI

Actresses in Malayalam cinema
Indian film actresses
Actresses from Kerala
20th-century Indian actresses
Living people
Year of birth missing (living people)
People from Alappuzha district